Thorvaldur Gylfason (Icelandic orthography Þorvaldur Gylfason; born 18 July 1951) is an Icelandic economist who has been active in Icelandic public life. On 27 November 2010, he was elected to be a delegate at the Icelandic Constitutional Assembly in 2011. He was also chairman of the Iceland Democratic Party.

Education
In 1973 he received the B.A. degree in economics at the University of Manchester. He received the PhD degree in economics at Princeton University in 1976.

Career
Thorvaldur Gylfason has been professor of economics at the University of Iceland since 1983. He was visiting professor of public and unternational affairs at Princeton in 1986–1988. Prior to this he was an economist at the International Monetary Fund (IMF) in Washington from 1976 to 1981.

Thorvaldur has been active in international policy debate as a research fellow at CESifo (Center for Economic Studies) at the University of Munich, research associate at the Center for U.S.-Japan Business and Economic Studies at New York University, and Fellow of the European Economic Association. He was senior research fellow at the Institute for International Economic Studies at Stockholm University in 1978–1996, and research fellow at CEPR (Centre for Economic Policy Research) in London in 1987–2009. He has been a frequent consultant to the International Monetary Fund and also the World Bank, the European Commission, and the European Free Trade Association (EFTA). He was chairman of the failed Icelandic bank Kaupthing from 1986 to 1990. He is also a fellow of the European Economic Association.

In 2013, the political party Iceland Democratic Party was formed. Thorvaldur was chairman. The party did not win a seat in parliament. Thorvaldur left the position of chairman in late 2013.

In 2019, Thorvaldur was offered the position of editor of the academic journal Nordic Economic Policy Review, but the offer was retracted after the Ministry of Finance mistakenly assumed he still held the position of chairman of the Iceland Democratic Party, the assumption being based on outdated information on Thorvaldur's Wikipedia page. The Ministry later apologized.

Publications
In the field of economics, Thorvaldur Gylfason has published numerous books, scientific papers in international journals and scholarly articles in his native Icelandic. He co-authored a book on the market economy that has been translated into seventeen languages, including Russian and Chinese.

Public debate
Þorvaldur has written regular columns on a wide range of subjects in the Icelandic newspaper Fréttablaðið since the early 2000s. He has been more prominent since the banking collapse of 2008.

Private life
Thorvaldur Gylfason is the son of former Finance Minister Gylfi Þorsteinsson Gíslason and brother of philosopher Thorsteinn Gylfason and politician Vilmundur Gylfason. He is married.

References

External links
 Thorvaldur Gylfason's website

Thorvaldur Gylfason
Living people
1951 births
Princeton University alumni
Alumni of the University of Manchester
Thorvaldur Gylfason
Fellows of the European Economic Association